The Vrsar Crljenka Airport is an airport for general aviation in Croatia. It is located about 2 km southeast of Vrsar.

The runway is 700m long and 18m wide. It is oriented north–south (runway mark 36–18). The altitude of the airport is 37 m. The runway thresholds are at 42.3m above sea level in the north (139') and 33.2 m above sea level (109') in the south, so that with a height difference of 9.1m (10') the runway has an inclination of 1.9 ° and 1.3%, respectively. The surface of the runway, the rolls and the platform are in asphalt.

Vrsar Airport was built in 1976. It is equipped to accommodate and maintain small-sized aircraft: it has a fuel pump, a hangar, an aircraft service, a restaurant and customs office. The operator is North Adria Aviation from Vrsar. Navigation services (flight plan, meteorological situation and air traffic control) are performed by the operator via Pula Airport.

It is intended for occasional air traffic and is involved in the following activities:
 Reception and maintenance of small-sized aircraft
 Panoramic flights over Istria
 Flights to domestic and foreign airports
 Sports flights (parachuting, training and competitions)
 Flights of medical services and rescue services
 Fire service flights
 Flights for advertising (throwing leaflets and pulling banners)

The airport is registered for domestic and foreign air traffic. For foreign air traffic, the airport is open from April to November.

Near the airport there is a memorial to Dragan Garvan and Dragutin Barić, members of the Croatian Air Force and air defense killed in the Croatian War of Independence who were brutally killed on December 21, 1991 during the Yugoslav army air attack on Crljenka airport. The shells of the cluster bomb were found 21 years later near the sports airport.

In 1998 Vrsar hosted the XXIV World Parachuting Championship, which was attended by 245 competitors.

References

External links
 Zračna luka Vrsar na ''Istarskoj enciklopediji
 Aeronautičke karte Sky Vector 
 Podatci o zračnoj luci Vrsar na The Great Circle Mapper

Airports in Croatia
1962 establishments in Croatia
Airports established in 1976
Airport
Buildings and structures in Istria County
Airport